Edgaras Dubickas (born 9 July 1998) is a Lithuanian professional footballer who plays as a forward for Italian  club Pordenone, on loan from Pisa, and the Lithuania national team.

Club career
He made his Serie C debut for Lecce on 30 September 2017 in a game against Bisceglie.

On 10 August 2018, following the loan in the 2017–18 season, he joined Lecce on a permanent basis, signing a three-year contract.

On 25 November 2019 he made his Serie A debut against Cagliari.

On 17 January 2020 he joined Serie C club Gubbio on loan.

On 1 February 2021 he was loaned to Serie C club Livorno.

On 6 July 2021, he signed a two-year contract with an additional option year with Piacenza.

On 19 August 2022, Dubickas signed a four-year contract with Pordenone.

On 31 January 2023, Dubickas signed with Pisa and was loaned back to Pordenone for the rest of the 2022–23 season.

International career
Dubickas debuted with the senior Lithuania national team in a friendly 4–0 loss to Spain on 8 June 2021.

References

External links
 
 
 

1998 births
Living people
Sportspeople from Marijampolė
Lithuanian footballers
Association football forwards
FK Sūduva Marijampolė players
Serie A players
Serie B players
Serie C players
U.S. Lecce players
A.S.D. Sicula Leonzio players
A.S. Gubbio 1910 players
U.S. Livorno 1915 players
Piacenza Calcio 1919 players
Pordenone Calcio players
Pisa S.C. players
Lithuanian expatriate footballers
Lithuanian expatriate sportspeople in Italy
Expatriate footballers in Italy
Lithuania youth international footballers
Lithuania under-21 international footballers
Lithuania international footballers